The 2005 Sherbrooke municipal election was held on November 6, 2005, to elect a mayor and city councillors in Sherbrooke, Quebec. The communities of Brompton and Lennoxville also elected borough councillors, who do not serve on the city council.

Results

Mayor

Councillors

Source: "Meet your new municipal councils," Sherbrooke Record, 7 November 2005, p. 9.

References

2005 Quebec municipal elections
2005